José Luis Espinoza (born December 17, 1969 in Mexico City, Mexico) is a Mexican retired jockey in American Thoroughbred horse racing.  Espinoza rode in his first Kentucky Derby in 2013, guiding Giant Finish to a 10th-place finish for Sunrise Stables and trainer Anthony Dutrow.

In August 2013, Espinoza suffered a traumatic brain injury when he was thrown from a mount after crossing the finish line.  This head injury effectively ended his career as a jockey.  After 8 months of treatment, he retired at the age of 44 with a total of 856 wins.

He is the older brother of U.S. Triple Crown winning jockey, Victor Espinoza.

Year-end charts

References

1969 births
Living people
American jockeys
Mexican jockeys
Mexican emigrants to the United States